Hermann von Kaulbach (26 July 1846 in Munich – 9 December 1909 in Munich) was a German painter of the Munich School.

Life 
Kaulbach was the son of painter Wilhelm von Kaulbach. He was originally a medical student at the Ludwig Maximilian University of Munich but, perhaps inspired by his father, quit school to study painting instead. In 1867, he became a student of Karl von Piloty. Under his influence, Kaulbach devoted himself almost entirely to historical themes. Ultimately though, he became best known for his portraits of children. He made two study trips to Rome, in 1880 and 1891. In 1886, he was appointed a Professor of History Painting at the Academy of Fine Arts Munich. In 1906 he published a picture book, with children as the motif, that sold 135,000 copies.

He was married to Sophie Schroll, the daughter of an engraver, and they had three children.
Many of his works are on display at the Museum in Bad Arolsen (his father's birthplace). His letters and other papers are in the collection of the German Literature Archive (part of the Museum of Modern Literature) in Marbach am Neckar. He is buried in the Alter Südfriedhof in Munich.

Criticism
Although his work was generally well received, he was occasionally criticized for giving too much attention to detail, while missing the significance of the painting's main subject. His portrait of Lucrezia Borgia created a controversy because it was considered "too lewd", and his version of the Coronation of St.Elizabeth by Emperor Frederick II was dismissed by some critics as "costume painting".

Major works 
 "Hansel und Gretel bei der Hexe"  (Hansel and Gretel with the Witch; 1872, in the Municipal Gallery, Riga)
 "Mozarts Letzte Tage" (Mozart's Last Days; 1878, in the Municipal Gallery, Vienna)
 Portrait of Anton Bruckner, (1885, in the Oberösterreichischen Landesmuseum – Schlossmuseum, Linz)
 "Krönung der heiligen Elisabeth durch Kaiser Friedrich II" (Coronation of St.Elisabeth by Emperor Frederick II; 1886, in the Museum at Wiesbaden)
 "An der Grabstätte des Freundes" (At the Tomb of a Friend; 1888, in the Neue Pinakothek, Munich)

Publications 
 Hermann Kaulbach: Bilderbuch. Mit 45 Bildern von Professor Hermann Kaulbach in München und einem Porträt des Künstlers (Text by Adelheid Stier), Union Deutsche Verlagsgesellschaft, First Edition, 1906

References

Further reading 
 Friedrich von Boetticher, Malerwerke des Neunzehnten Jahrhunderts: Beitrag zur Kunstgeschichte, Dresden, 1891 (Neudruck 1974), Vol. 1, Part 2, S. 688
 Allgemeines Künstlerlexikon: Die Bildenden Künstler aller Zeiten und Völker, K.G. Saur, Munich 1992, S. 144

External links 

 
 
 Originalzeichnung „Scheiben-Toni“ für das Bundesschießen München 1906

1846 births
1909 deaths
History painters
Artists from Munich
19th-century German painters
19th-century German male artists
German male painters
Munich School